The men's 69 kg (151.8 lbs) Semi-Contact category at the W.A.K.O. World Championships 2007 in Coimbra was the third lightest of the male Semi-Contact tournaments falling in between the welterweight and light middleweight divisions when compared to Full-Contact's weight classes.  There were nineteen men from four continents (Europe, Asia, Africa and North America) taking part in the competition.  Each of the matches was three rounds of two minutes each and were fought under Semi-Contact rules.   

Due to the fact there were too few contestants for a tournament of thirty-two, thirteen of the men received a bye through to the second round.  The tournament winner was Italian Gregorio Di Leo who won his third W.A.K.O. Semi-Contact gold medal by defeating Tamás Imre of Hungary in the final by points decision.  Defeated semi finalists Pole Przemysław Ziemnicki and Greek Kostas Taboureas were rewarded for their efforts with bronze medals.

Results

Key

See also 
 List of WAKO Amateur World Championships
 List of WAKO Amateur European Championships
 List of male kickboxers

References

External links 
 WAKO World Association of Kickboxing Organizations Official Site

Kickboxing events at the WAKO World Championships 2007 Coimbra
2007 in kickboxing
Kickboxing in Portugal